Bredinsky District is an administrative and municipal district (raion), one of the twenty-seven in Chelyabinsk Oblast, Russia. It is located in the south of the oblast. Its administrative center is the rural locality (a settlement) of Bredy. Population:  33,039 (2002 Census);  The population of Bredy accounts for 33.2% of the district's total population.

References

Notes

Sources

Districts of Chelyabinsk Oblast